Calvin is an unincorporated community in Nicholas County, West Virginia, United States. Calvin has a post office with ZIP code 26660.

References

Unincorporated communities in Nicholas County, West Virginia
Unincorporated communities in West Virginia